The Russian names Anoushka, Anouska, Anuschka or, Annushka are diminutive forms of the female given name Anna, derived from the Russian diminutive . Anoushka also means "grace" or "a favour" in Persian. The Indian name Anushka means "ray of light" in Sanskrit. Notable people with the name include:

Anoushka
Anoushka (Egyptian singer) (born 1960), stage name of Egyptian singer Wartanoush Garbis Selim
Anoushka Parikh (born 1997), Indian badminton player
Anoushka Shankar (born 1981), Indian American sitar player and composer
Anoushka Sabnis (born 2007), Indian author and poet
Anoushka Schut-Welkzijn (born 1969), Dutch politician

Anouska
Anouska Golebiewski, participant in season 4 of Big Brother
Anouska Hempel (born 1941), sometimes Anoushka Hempel, New Zealand actress, hotelier and designer
Anouska Koster (born 1993), Dutch racing cyclist
Anouska van der Zee (born 1976), Dutch racing cyclist

Anousjka
Anousjka van Exel (born 1974), Dutch tennis player

Anuschka
Anuschka Gläser (born 1969), German former pair skater
Anuschka Tischer (born 1968), German historian

Anushka
Anushka Asthana (born 1980), Indian-British journalist
Anushka Jasraj, Indian fiction writer
Anushka Manchanda (born 1984), Indian singer
Anushka Naiknaware (born 2003), Indian-American inventor, scientist and speaker
Anushka Patel, Australian scientist and cardiologist
Anushka Perera (born 1993), Sri Lankan cricketer
Anushka Polonowita (born 1977), Sri Lankan cricketer
Anushka Ranjan (born 1990), Indian film actress and model
Anushka Ravishankar, Indian author of children's books, and co-founder of Duckbill Books, a publishing house
Anushka Sanjeewani (born 1990), Sri Lankan cricketer 
Anushka Sen (born 2002), Indian model and television actress
Anushka Shahaney also known as Anushqa, Indian singer and songwriter
Anushka Sharma (born 1988), Indian actress
Anushka Shetty (born 1981), South Indian actress
Anushka Shrestha (born 1995), Nepalese beauty pageant
Anushka Singh (born 1964), Indian model and actress

See also
Anoushka (disambiguation)

Russian feminine given names
Persian feminine given names
Indian feminine given names